Hiwi refer to:

 Hiwi (volunteer), POWs of occupied nations who volunteered to help the Nazis
 Hiwi al-Balkhi, the first Jewish Bible critic
 Hiwi people, a people of Colombia and Venezuela
 Guahibo language, the Cuahiban language spoken by them 
 Waia language, a Trans-Fly language of Papua New Guinea 
 Waboda language, a Trans–New-Guinea language spoken in the Fly River delta, Papua New Guinea 

Language and nationality disambiguation pages